The Stepmother is a 1972 suspense film directed and produced by Howard L. Avedis and released theatrically in the U.S. by Crown International Pictures. It stars Alejandro Rey as an architect who murders a client he suspects is having an affair with his wife.

Cast
 Alejandro Rey as Frank Delgado
 John Anderson as Inspector Darnezi
 Katherine Justice as Margo Delgado
 Larry Linville as Dick Hill
 Marlene Schmidt as Sonya Hill
 Claudia Jennings as Rita
 Rudy Herrera Jr. as Steve Delgado

Awards
Composer Sammy Fain and lyricist Paul Francis Webster were nominated for the Academy Award for Best Original Song for "Strange Are the Ways of Love."

Reception
Leonard Maltin, writing in Leonard Maltin's Movie Guide, gave the film one-and-a-half-stars, commenting that, "Rey is okay as anti-hero of this cheapie murder-suspenser in the Hitchcock mold."

See also
 List of American films of 1972

References

External links
 

1972 films
1970s erotic drama films
1970s exploitation films
1970s thriller drama films
Adultery in films
American erotic thriller films
American exploitation films
American independent films
American thriller drama films
Crown International Pictures films
American erotic drama films
Films about murderers
Films shot in Mexico
1972 directorial debut films
1972 drama films
1970s English-language films
1970s American films